Koby Maxwell, (born 25 November 1978, as Maxwell Koby Okwensy) is a Ghanaian musician, singer, actor and producer who currently resides in Washington, D.C. in the United States. He says that his goal is to maintain the authenticity of African music, while incorporating the sounds of others. In June 2010, he became a film producer and executive producer when he hired a US film production company to produce his first Nollywood feature film, entitled Paparazzi Eye in the Dark.

In 2016 he started producing a show on the North American TV channel ABC2 called Nollyhot TV which was first aired on 6 January that year. The show captures happenings within the Nigerian entertainment industry of Nollywood for an American audience. Nollyhot TV is also broadcast on the DCW 50 and The CW television channels in the USA.  Koby Maxwell Productions in association with Lafa Media & Zealmatic Pictures also came out with a 2019 movie titled The Wrong One.

Family and early life
Koby Maxwell is the oldest of six children. Since arriving in America in 2000, he has performed in prominent places such as the Kennedy Center and the Radio City Music Hall in New York City. He has shared the stage with artists including Nancy Wilson, Chaka Khan and Dionne Warwick. In August 2006 he performed with reggae star Sean Paul, Barrington Levy, Sanchez, Ziggy and Stephen Marley, Bunny Wailer and Salif Keita at Reggae on the River. Maxwell also gained additional recognition as a key performer in Detroit's 21st African World Festival.

Discography

Filmography

Awards
 2009 Award of Excellence & Outstanding Performer: Next Vision Entertainment
 2010 Humanitarian Award: Doctors for the Village
 2010 USA Excellence in African Music: 3G Media
 2011 Producer Achievement Award: Nollywood USA
 2013 Best Film in Diaspora NAFCA 2013 
 2013 Favorite Male Artist Nafca 2013
 2014 Outstanding Entertainer at DD Records
 2014 DMV African movie producer of the year 
 2015 Caribbean Movie Festival, for achievement in the film industry

References

External links
 
 

Ghanaian record producers
1975 births
Living people
Ghanaian film producers